The 1992 Soviet Cup Final was a football match that took place at the Luzhniki Stadium, Moscow, on 10 May 1992. The Soviet Union was in the process of being dismantled with all organizations such as the Football Federation of USSR abandoned. Therefore, the game was administered by the Russian Football Union.

The match was the 51st Soviet Cup Final and it was contested by FC Spartak Moscow and PFC CSKA Moscow. The Soviet Cup winner Spartak  qualified for the Cup Winners' Cup first round for the Russian Federation. Spartak played their 15th Cup Final winning on 10 occasions including this one. CSKA came to the final as the defending champions and it was their eighth Cup Final and for the third time they were defeated at this stage.

Road to Moscow 

All sixteen Soviet Top League clubs did not have to go through qualification to get into the competition, so Spartak and CSKA both qualified for the competition automatically.

Previous encounters 

Previously these two teams met each other in the early editions of the competition on several occasions. However this was their first time and the last that they met in the finals of the Soviet Cup.

Match details

See also
 Soviet Top League 1991
 Main Moscow derby

References

External links 
 Report

1992
Soviet Cup Final
Soviet Cup Final 1992
Soviet Cup Final 1992
May 1992 sports events in Europe
1992 in Moscow